The 2015 South Australian National Football League season (officially the SANFL IGA League) was the 136th season of the South Australian National Football League (SANFL) Australian rules football competition.

The season commenced on Thursday 2 April 2015 with reigning premiers Norwood meeting Sturt at Norwood Oval, and concluded on Sunday 27 September 2015 with the SANFL Grand Final at Adelaide Oval with  defeating  by 30 points to claim their ninth premiership and first in thirty-two years.

Premiership season
Highlights of the season fixture include:
 A 19-round home and away competition, in which each team plays each other twice
 A Grand Final rematch, featuring arch rivals Norwood and Port Adelaide, to be played under lights on Friday 24 April at Adelaide Oval. Glenelg will host Adelaide on the same night at Glenelg Oval.
 At least one match to be played in regional South Australia with Adelaide tackling Port Adelaide at Balaklava Oval in Round 7, Sunday 17 May. West Adelaide could host Port Adelaide in the Riverland on Saturday 13 June (Round 10), which is still to be confirmed.

Round 1

Round 2

Round 3

Round 4

Round 5

Round 6

Round 7

State Game

 Report

Round 8

Round 9

Round 10

Round 11

Round 12

Round 13

Round 14

Round 15

Round 16

Round 17

Round 18

Round 19

Ladder

Finals series

Qualifying and Elimination Finals

Semi-finals

Preliminary final

Grand Final

Club performances

Overview by club

SANFL Win/Loss Table

Bold – Home game
X – Did Not Play
Opponent for round listed above margin
|}

Awards and premiers

Awards
 The Magarey Medal (awarded to the best and fairest player in the home and away season) was won by Joel Cross of South Adelaide, who polled 25 votes. It was Cross' second Magarey Medal, having tied for the medal in 2012.
 The Ken Farmer Medal (awarded to the leading goalkicker in the home and away season) was won by Clint Alleway of Glenelg. He kicked 47 goals in the 2015 home and away season.
 The Stanley H. Lewis Memorial Trophy (awarded to the best performing club in the League, Reserves and Under 18 competitions) was won by Woodville West-Torrens, with 3300 points, which was 1050 points ahead of second-place Norwood.
 The R.O. Shearman Medal (awarded to the player adjudged best by the 10 SANFL club coaches each game) was won by Joel Cross of South Adelaide.
 Woodville-West Torrens were the league minor premiers, finishing top of the ladder at the end of the home and away season with 16 wins and 2 losses. It is the club's 5th minor premiership in the SANFL.
 The annual City v. Country Cup Match was held in May 2015 at the Adelaide Oval. The match was won by Country, who defeated City by 96 points; 14.15 (99) to 0.3 (3).
 The Under 16 Talent Shield competition was won by Sturt, who defeated South Adelaide in the Grand Final by 57 points; 14.12 (96) to 5.9 (39).

Premiers
  were the League premiers, defeating  by 30 points.
  were the Reserves premiers, defeating  by 27 points.
  were the Under 18 premiers, defeating  by 18 points.

Notes

References
 2015 SANFL IGA League Official Fixture (PDF)

South Australian National Football League seasons
SANFL